Chak Chao is a village in Batala in Gurdaspur district of Punjab State, India. The village is administered by sarpanch, an elected representative of the village.

Demography 
As of 2011, the village had 163 houses and a population of 670, of which 342 were male and while 328 were female. The literacy rate of the village was 91.75%, higher than the state average of 75.84%. The population of children under the age of 6 years was 56 (8.36% of total population of the village).

See also
List of villages in India

References 

Villages in Gurdaspur district